Christina Knutsdatter of Denmark, in Norway known as Kristin Knutsdotter, (c. 1118–1139) was a Danish princess who became Queen of Norway as the spouse of King Magnus IV the Blind of Norway.

Christina was born to Canute Lavard and Ingeborg of Kiev. Her marriage to Magnus was arranged by her maternal aunt, Malmfred, former Queen of Norway and the former stepmother of Magnus, and at the time the wife of Christina's paternal uncle Eric. Christina was engaged in 1131, and the marriage took place in 1132/33.

King Magnus supported the struggle of her father Canute and uncle Eric against King Niels of Denmark. In 1133, Eric and Malmfrid fled Denmark for Norway and the protection of Magnus. After Queen Christina, however, found out that Magnus had plans to betray them, she warned them, and Eric and Malmfrid allied themselves with Magnus' rival, Harald IV of Norway. King Magnus then separated from Queen Christina.

References 
 Alf Henrikson: Dansk historia (Danish history) (1989) (Swedish)
 Sven Rosborn (In Swedish): När hände vad i Nordens historia (When did what happen in the historiy of the Nordic countries) (1997)
 Edvard Bull. »Magnus Blinde» I: Norsk biografisk leksikon, 1. utg. Bd 9. 1938
 Nils Petter Thuesen. »Magnus 4 Sigurdsson Blinde» I: Norsk biografisk leksikon, 2. utg. Bd 6. 2003.
 Knut Helle. Aschehougs Norgeshistorie. Bd 3. Under kirke og kongemakt. 1995

	

|-

12th-century deaths
Norwegian royal consorts
12th-century Norwegian women
12th-century Norwegian people
12th-century Danish women
12th-century Danish people
Danish princesses
House of Estridsen
Year of birth unknown
Fairhair dynasty
Daughters of monarchs